This is a list of United States Air Force Bomb Squadrons.  It covers all squadrons that were constituted or redesignated as bombardment squadron sometime during their active service.  Today Bomb Squadrons are considered to be part of the Combat Air Force (CAF) along with fighter squadrons.  Units in this list are assigned to nearly every Major Command in the United States Air Force.  All the active Bomb Squadrons are in Bold.

Bomb Squadrons

Squadrons 1 to 110

Squadrons 300 to 399

Squadrons 400 to 499

Squadrons 500 to 599

Squadrons 600 to 699

Squadrons 700 to 799

Squadrons 800 to 899

Squadrons 900 onwards

Bomb